Igor Špirić (born 22 June 1971) is a Serbian luger. He competed for Yugoslavia  in the men's singles event at the 1992 Winter Olympics.

References

External links 
 
 

1971 births
Living people
Serbian male lugers
Olympic lugers of Yugoslavia
Lugers at the 1992 Winter Olympics
Place of birth missing (living people)